Etc... is a Czech rock band from Prague, formed in 1974 by singer and guitarist Vladimír Mišík. Various musicians have rotated through the group's ranks, including violist Jan Hrubý (Framus Five), bassist Jiří Veselý (Stromboli, Žlutý pes), guitarist Petr "Kulich" Pokorný (Framus Five, Žlutý Pes), drummer Ivan Kadaňka, bassist/cellist Jaroslav Olin Nejezchleba, as well as bassists Vladimír Padrůněk and Vladimír Guma Kulhánek.

Between 1982 and 1985, the group was banned from performing by the Communist government.

In 2010, Etc... was inducted into the Beatová síň slávy (Beat Hall of Fame) and released the album Ztracený podzim.

In 2011, the group, minus Vladimír Mišík, released a collaboration album with Vladimír Merta, titled Ponorná řeka.

Band members

Current
 Vladimír Mišík – guitar, vocals
 Petr "Kulich" Pokorný – guitar
 Pavel Skála – guitar, vocals
 Jiří Zelenka – drums, vocals
 Vladimír Pavlíček – violin
 Jiří Veselý – bass

Former
 Vladimír Guma Kulhánek – bass
 Jan Hrubý – violin
 Vladimír Padrůněk – bass
 Jaroslav Olin Nejezchleba – double bass, cello
 Ivan Kadaňka – drums
 Pavel Novák – bass
 Anatoli Kohout
 František Francl
 Jiří Jelínek
 Petr Skoumal
 Stanislav Kubeš

Discography
 Etc… (1976; also known as Stříhali dohola malého chlapečka)
 They Cut Off the Little Boy's Hair (1978; English version of Etc…)
 Etc… 2 (1980)
 Etc… 3 (1987)
 Etc… 4 (1987)
 Jiří Jelínek in memoriam (1987)
 20 deka duše (1990)
 Nechte zpívat Mišíka (1991; live recording)
 Jen se směj (1993)
 Unplugged (1994; live recording)
 Město z peřin (1996)
 Nůž na hrdle (1999)
 Umlkly stroje (2004)
 Archa + hosté (2008)
 Déja vu (1976–1987) Box I. (2009; set of remastered first four albums)
 Ztracený podzim (2010)
 Déja vu (1989–1996) Box II. (2010; second set of four remastered albums)
 Ponorná řeka (2011; with Vladimír Merta)

References

External links

 
 Etc… at Discogs

Musical groups established in 1974
Czech rock music groups
1974 establishments in Czechoslovakia